U.S. Route 69 (US-69) is a major north-south U.S. Highway that runs from Port Arthur, Texas to Albert Lea, Minnesota. In Kansas, the highway runs in the far eastern part of the state, usually within 5 miles of the Missouri state line. Most of the highway north of Fort Scott runs as a freeway.

Route description

US-69 enters Kansas just north of Miami, Oklahoma as a concurrency with the southern terminus of K-7. The highway crosses US-166 west of Treece before K-7 leaves the concurrency with the intersection of US-160 in Columbus, of which U.S. 160 begins another overlap with U.S. 69. The two routes head east for 7 miles (10 km) before US-400 joins the overlap in Crestline and head north, before U.S. 400 leaves the highway south of Pittsburg. As the two highways leave Pittsburg, the route becomes a short 4-lane expressway before US-160 leaves the highway as it exits Frontenac. Just after US-69 meets the eastern terminus with K-47 in Franklin, the route reverts back to a 2-lane highway before entering the town of Arma. US-69 then becomes a 4-lane expressway near Garland. US-69 meets with K-7 for a second time as a partial interchange and the two routes continue north to Fort Scott. As the undivided freeway begins, U.S. Route 54 joins the overlap for 1/2 mile (0.8 km); both US-54 and K-7 leaves the overlap just north of the city limits as US-69 continues north as a divided freeway. The freeway runs through the towns of Pleasanton and Trading Post, as well as more rural areas before entering the Kansas City metropolitan area at Overland Park.

In Overland Park, US-69 interchanges with Interstate 435/US-50/US-169 before beginning an overlap with I-35/US-56 in Lenexa. US-69 and US-56 leave I-35 in Merriam, traveling back into Overland Park. US-56 leaves the highway, running into KCM. US-69 rejoins I-35 again at an interchange with I-635. US-69 leaves I-35 again and runs along the 18th Street Expressway to I-70/US-40 in KCK. US-69 joins I-70/US-40 and leaves again at an interchange with I-670/US-169. US-69 enters Missouri just past the intersection with K-5, crossing the Missouri River.

History

18th Street Expressway
The 18th Street Expressway was the result of one of four feasibility studies conducted by the Kansas Turnpike Authority to extend the turnpike by providing easy access to northeast Johnson County. It was the only one of the four studies to be followed upon, with completion of the 18th Street Expressway Bridge over the Kansas River completed in 1959. It replaced the Argentine Boulevard bridge over the river behind the modern-day BNSF railroad yard.

Originally, the highway was part of the original K-58. Upon completion of the bridge, US-69 was rerouted onto the expressway from Southwest Boulevard (the section of which has since been renamed to Merriam Drive). In 1979, the K-58 designation was removed.

The section of 18th Street between I-70 and the southern end of the Kansas River bridge was tolled at least as late as 1984.

Reconstruction
In early April 2020, a $21.8 million construction project to finish a four-lane expressway from Pittsburg to Kansas City began. The project will be completed by Koss Construction Company of Topeka and will be completed by August 2021.

Overland Park toll lanes
As Overland Park has grown in recent years, US-69 south of 103rd Street has become the busiest four-lane highway in Kansas. On June 21, 2021, the Overland Park city council approved a toll lane to be added to both directions of US-69 between 103rd Street and 151st Street. Since then, the Kansas Turnpike Authority and the State Finance Council have also approved the project, which was required by a new Kansas law that allows toll lanes to pay for road expansion.

Junction list

Special routes

Alternate route

U.S. Route 69 Alternate (US-69 Alt.) is a special route of U.S. Highway 69, traveling  between junctions east of Commerce, Oklahoma and north of Crestline, Kansas.

US-69 Alt., cosigned with Historic Route 66, splits from mainline US 69 south of Picher and west of Quapaw. US-69 Alt. and HR-66 head ENE through the towns of Quapaw and Baxter Springs, Kansas. North of Baxter Springs, US 400 joins the concurrency. West of Riverton, HR-66 heads east along K-66, while US-69 Alt. and US 400 head north. North of Crestline, US-69 Alt. and US 400 meet US 69 and US 160 from the west. US-69 Alt. terminates as US 69 and US 160 merge with US 400. The concurrency of US 69, US 400, and US 160 continues north.

Pittsburg Business loop

U.S. Route 69 Business (US 69 Business) is a business route of US 69 running through Pittsburg. Its southern terminus is at US-69 and its northern terminus is at US-69.

Major Intersections

Arma business loop

U.S. Route 69 Business (US 69 Business) is a business route of US 69 running through Arma. Its southern terminus is at US-69 and K-47 and its northern terminus is at US-69.

Major Intersections

References

External links

 Kansas Highway Maps: Current, Historic, KDOT

 Kansas
Transportation in the Kansas City metropolitan area
Transportation in Kansas City, Kansas
69
Transportation in Cherokee County, Kansas
Transportation in Crawford County, Kansas
Transportation in Bourbon County, Kansas
Transportation in Linn County, Kansas
Transportation in Miami County, Kansas
Transportation in Johnson County, Kansas
Transportation in Wyandotte County, Kansas